A gold record is a common designation for music recording certifications.

Gold Record may also refer to:
Gold Record (album), a 2020 album by Bill Callahan
The Gold Record, a 2006 album by the Bouncing Souls

See also
Golden Record (disambiguation)